The 2000 Salt Lake County mayoral election was the first election held to elect the first Mayor of Salt Lake County, Utah on November 7, 2000, alongside the presidential, House of Representatives, Senate and gubernatorial elections.

Utah Code (Title 17, Chapter 52a, Part 2) allows counties in the state to choose one of four forms of county government:
 Standard three-member full-time commission,
 Expanded five- or seven-member full-time commission,
 Three-, five-, seven- or nine-member part-time council with a full-time appointed manager,
 or a three-, five-, seven- or nine-member part-time council with a full-time elected mayor.

Like most other counties in Utah, Salt Lake County used to be governed by a three-member county commission. However, in 1998, county voters approved the change in form of government to a nine-member council with an elected mayor, that was to take effect in 2001, following 2000 elections.

Republican county Recorder Nancy Workman won the election, alongside presidential candidate George W. Bush and Senator Orrin Hatch. The only Democrat to win the county during the election cycle was gubernatorial candidate Bill Orton.

Candidates

Democratic Party
 Karen Crompton, 1998 candidate for county commission

Republican Party
 Nancy Workman, county recorder

Dropped out
 Brent Overson, county commissioner

Results

References

2000 Utah elections
2000 United States mayoral elections
2000 in Utah
2000s in Salt Lake City